The Battle of Ambon (30 January – 3 February 1942) occurred on the island of Ambon in the Dutch East Indies (now Indonesia), as part of the Japanese offensive on the Dutch colony during World War II. In the face of a combined defense by Dutch and Australian troops, Japanese forces conquered the island and its strategic airfield in several days. In the aftermath of the fighting, a major massacre of many Dutch and Australian prisoners of war (POW) followed suit.

Background
Ambon is located in the Maluku (Moluccas) islands, just south of the much larger island of Seram (Ceram). Ambon has what might be described as a "figure eight" or "hourglass" shape, and consists of two peninsulae separated by a narrow isthmus, with long narrow bays on either side of the isthmus. The key airport at Laha is in the west of the Hitu Peninsula – northern part of the island – facing Ambon Bay. The town of Ambon is at the opposite side of the bay, on the southern part of the island, Laitimor Peninsula.

Despite being one of the islands of the Dutch East Indies' outlying regions, the Dutch knew Ambon' had strategic importance as an airbase and had been reinforcing its defense since 1941, adding additional  Royal Netherlands East Indies Army (KNIL)  troops from Java. Yet as far back as 1940, Australia also saw the island's significance as a nearby stepping-stone for Japanese forces to attack Australia from the north. In an agreement with the Dutch government-in-exile (which still held a neutral stance on Japan in 1940), Canberra agreed to bolster Dutch defenses by sending in troops and equipment to Ambon and Timor islands. Brigadier Edmund Lind, commander of the Australian 23rd Brigade held significant reservations about sending troops to Ambon, given the lack of firepower and air assets available to the Australian troops, in addition to an absence of Australian military liaison units embedded with the local Dutch forces.

Order of Battle

Japan

Ground Forces

Naval Forces

Netherlands

Australia

United States 

 Patrol Wing (PatWing) 10 (Commander: Capt. Frank. D Wagner):
 Eight Consolidated PBY Catalina

Pre-battle

Allies

Infantry

At the outbreak of war on 8 December, Ambon was garrisoned by the 2,800-strong Molukken Brigade of the Royal Netherlands East Indies Army (KNIL) garrison, commanded by Lieutenant Colonel Joseph Kapitz and consisting of Indonesian colonial troops, under European officers. The garrison was poorly equipped and trained, partly as a result of the Netherlands having been defeated and occupied by Nazi Germany. The KNIL units were not equipped with radios and relied on landlines and written communications. They included 300 partly trained reservists. The Australian Army's 1,100-strong Gull Force, commanded by Lieutenant Colonel Leonard Roach, arrived on 17 December. The force consisted of the 2/21st Battalion from the Australian 8th Division, as well as some divisional artillery and support units. Kapitz was appointed Allied commander on Ambon. On the very day the Gull Force disembarked in Ambon, Roach raised concerns that mirrored those expressed by Brigadier Lind. Roach raised concerns about the lack of reconnaissance missions being conducted, medical equipment, anti-tank weapons and the absence of any field guns. This request was repeated on 23 December 1941, to which Army Headquarters rejected and reiterated the need to defend with the supplies available.

On 6 January, after Dutch and British territories to the north fell to Japan and a bombing run on Ambon by Japanese aircraft, Roach once again raised concerns with Army Headquarters and stated that his forces could hold out for no more than one day without reinforcements. Following this communication, Roach was relieved of command and was replaced by Lieutenant Colonel John Scott on 14 January. This change in command caused significant problems as Scott had no prior knowledge of the situation in Ambon and was not acquainted with much of the Gull Force.  Throughout early to late January, many troops of Gull Force were taken out of action due to malaria and dysentery.

Kapitz's headquarters was at Halong, between Paso and the town of Ambon. It included four armoured cars, an anti-aircraft machine gun detachment and four 40 mm AA guns. In the belief that the terrain on the south coast of Laitimor was too inhospitable for landings and that any attack was likely to be in the east, around the Bay of Baguala, the KNIL forces were concentrated at Paso, near the isthmus, under Major H. H. L. Tieland. There were small KNIL detachments at likely landing places in the north of Hitu.

Two companies of the 2/21st Battalion and 300 Dutch troops were at Laha Airfield, under the command of Major Mark Newbury. They were accompanied by Dutch artillery: four 75 mm field artillery pieces, four 37 mm anti-tank guns, four 75 mm anti-aircraft (AA) guns, four 40 mm AA guns, an AA machine gun platoon and an AA machine gun battery.

However, Lieutenant Colonel Scott, Gull Force HQ and the remainder of the Australian troops were concentrated in the western part of Laitimor Peninsula, in case of an attack from the Bay of Ambon. "A" Company of the 2/21st and one KNIL company were stationed at Eri, on the south west side of the bay. The 2/21st Battalion's pioneer platoon was on the plateau around Mt Nona (the highest point on Laitimor), with a Dutch anti-aircraft machine gun detachment. Smaller Australian detachments were at: Latuhalat, near the south western tip of Laitimor and at Cape Batuanjut, just north of Eri. Gull Force HQ and a strategic reserve, "D" Company, were located on a line from the Nona plateau to Amahusu beach, between Eri and the town of Ambon.

Air Forces 
The Allies had few aircraft to spare. The KNIL Air Service sent No. 2 Flight, Group IV (2-Vl. G.IV) from Java to Laha. Of an original four Brewster Buffalos, two crashed en route to Ambon. The Royal Australian Air Force (RAAF) sent two flights, comprising 12 Lockheed Hudson Mk 2 light bombers, from No. 13 and No. 2 Squadrons, to the area, under Wing Commander Ernest Scott (who was not related to Lieutenant Colonel John Scott). One flight was based at Laha, and another was sent to Namlea on the neighbouring island of Buru.

The U.S. Navy's Patrol Wing 10, with Consolidated PBY Catalinas, was based at the Halong seaplane station from 23 December. Wing Headquarters moved to Java on 9 January, but American Catalinas mounted patrols from Halong until 15 January when an air raid destroyed three patrol aircraft and damaged several others. The Allies then abandoned the base as it was too exposed. The Wing's seaplane tenders supported patrols, but left after 8 January.

The Royal Netherlands Naval Air Service (Marineluchtvaartdienst) flew patrols from Ambon/Halong; GVT 17 with Catalina flying boats continued from the start of war through 14 January, when it was ordered to Java.

U.S. Navy and RAAF aircraft made several very dangerous evacuation flights into Ambon/Laha in the last days of January after Allied forces lost all air superiority to Japanese forces.

Naval forces
, a Royal Netherlands Navy minelayer, left Ambon in early January, after mining approaches to the island. By mid-January, the minesweeper USS Heron was the only Allied combat ship at Ambon.

Japan
The 2nd Carrier Division was assigned to support the operation. They launched 54 aircraft (18 B5N2 "Kate" torpedo bombers, 18 D3A1 "Val" dive bombers, and 18 A6M2 "Zero" fighters) and bombed port facilities and buildings on Ambon. No losses were sustained. The carrier fleet returned to Davao, Philippines on 25 January 1942, prior to the invasion on 30 January 1942.

Battle

30 January
From 6 January onward, Ambon was attacked by Japanese aircraft. Allied aircraft made some sorties against the approaching Japanese fleet, with little success. On 13 January, the two Brewster Buffalo fighters, piloted by Lt Broers and Sgt Blans, attacked a flight of 10 Mitsubishi A6M Zero fighters. Broers' aircraft was hit and caught fire, but he continued to attack until it became uncontrollable, at which point he abandoned the Buffalo, using his parachute and landed in the sea. Blans was also shot down but also managed to use his parachute, landing in trees on Ambon. Both men were rescued. Broers suffered severe burns and Blans had 17 different wounds.

The naval aviation base at Halong was soon rendered unusable by Japanese air raids, and was abandoned by the Dutch and U.S. navies in mid-January.

On 30 January, about 1,000 Japanese marines and IJA personnel landed at Hitu-lama on the north coast. Other elements of the 228th Regiment landed on the southern coast of the Laitimor Peninsula. Although the Japanese ground forces were numerically not much bigger than the Allies, the Japanese had overwhelming superiority in air support, naval and field artillery, and tanks. The remaining Allied aircraft were withdrawn that day, although RAAF ground staff remained. Within a day of the Japanese landings, the Dutch detachments in their vicinity were overrun and/or had withdrawn towards Paso. The destruction of bridges on Hitu was not carried out as ordered, hastening the Japanese advance.

There was a second wave of landings, at Hutumori in south-eastern Laitimor, and at Batugong, near Paso. An Australian infantry platoon was detached to reinforce the pioneers on Nona plateau. The defences at Paso had been designed to repel attacks from the north and west, and now faced assault from the south. A KNIL platoon was detached from Paso to resist the attack on Batugong, causing a gap in the Dutch lines. The Japanese took advantage of this, and were assisted by the failure of a KNIL telephone line.

31 January
Batugong fell in the early hours of 31 January, enabling the Japanese to encircle the eastern flank of the Passo positions. Meanwhile, Kapitz ordered the Ambonese KNIL company at Eri to take up a position at Kudamati, which appeared prone to attack.

Telephone communications between Kapitz and his subordinates, including Lieutenant Colonel Scott, ceased when the Japanese cut the lines. The Japanese force which had landed at Hitu-Lama then attacked the Passo defences from the north-east. Then, in the words of the Australian official historian:

[a]t 6 p.m. a motor-cycle with sidecar was seen on the road to the west of the Passo position showing white flags and travelling towards the Japanese. Firing on the Passo perimeter was suspended on the orders of the Dutch company commanders, and the troops were allowed to rest and eat.

It is not clear who authorised the surrender. There was no immediate response from the Japanese, and – in a meeting with company commanders – Kapitz and Tieland ordered the Dutch troops to recommence fighting. However, when Tieland and the company commanders returned to their positions, they found that their troops had been taken prisoner, and they were forced to surrender.

The first land attack on Laha occurred on the afternoon of 31 January. An Australian platoon north-east of the airfield was attacked by a stronger Japanese force, which it repelled.

Japanese forces were also approaching the town of Ambon from the south west. At about 04:00pm on 31 January, the Japanese captured the town, including an Australian casualty clearing unit.

1 February
Several Japanese attacks were launched simultaneously on 1 February:
Kapitz and his headquarters staff were taken prisoner in the early hours. Kapitz surrendered the remaining forces in the Paso area and sent a note to Lieutenant Colonel Scott urging him to do the same. (The message did not reach Scott for two days.)
an Australian transport unit and KNIL positions at Kudamati were attacked by infantry
mountain guns in high ground were shelling a Dutch artillery battery on the coast at Benteng, which was forced to withdraw, putting further pressure on Kudamati.
infantry attacked the eastern flank of Australian positions at Amahusu.
on Nona plateau, a foothold was established in spite of fierce Australian opposition.
Japanese aircraft and naval artillery attacks on the positions at Eri.
The Australian positions were also receiving large numbers of Dutch personnel fleeing from Paso. At 22:30, Scott ordered a withdrawal of the Allied forces at Amahusu and the south-west, to Eri. The position at Kudamati was effectively encircled.

2–3 February
On 2 February (some sources say 1 February), the Japanese W-7-class minesweeper W-9 struck a mine laid by the Dutch minelayer HNLMS Gouden Leeuw in the Ambon Bay and sank. Two other Japanese minesweepers were also damaged by mines.

After dawn on 2 February, the main Australian force on Nona plateau, commanded by Lieutenant Bill Jinkins, was in danger of encirclement. Jinkins ordered a withdrawal to Amahusu, where he became aware that the Dutch had surrendered. Unable to ascertain the disposition of Lieutenant Colonel Scott's force, Jinkins decided to meet senior Japanese officers under truce at the town of Ambon. They allowed him to speak to Kapitz, who wrote another note advising the Australian commander to surrender. Jinkins set off to find Lieutenant Colonel Scott.

Meanwhile, the Japanese forces attacking Laha were reinforced and a concentrated assault on the Allies began, including naval artillery, dive bombers, fighter planes and probing attacks by infantry. A Japanese night attack in high grass near the beach, between two Allied positions, was beaten back by an Australian platoon. However, a massive Japanese offensive commenced at dawn on 2 February. By 10:00am, only about 150 Australians and several KNIL personnel were still able to fight at Laha, and Newbury ordered them to surrender.

By the morning of 3 February, the Australians around Eri were struggling to cope with increasing air and naval attacks, wounded Australians, the influx of Dutch personnel, diminishing supplies and widespread fatigue. A Japanese flag had been seen flying on the other side of the bay, at Laha. By the time Jinkins reached Lieutenant Colonel Scott, the latter had himself met the Japanese and decided to surrender. The Allied position at Kudamati was surrendered separately at midday.

Aftermath

Laha massacre

Allied casualties in the battle were relatively light. However, at intervals for a fortnight after the surrender, IJN personnel chose more than 300 Australian and Dutch prisoners of war at random and summarily executed them, at or near Laha airfield. In part, this was revenge for the sinking of the Japanese minesweeper, as some surviving crew of the minesweeper took part. Those killed included Wing Commander Scott and Major Newbury. According to an Australian War Memorial principal historian, Dr Peter Stanley, over the following three and a half years, the surviving POWs:

...suffered an ordeal and a death rate second only to the horrors of Sandakan, first on Ambon and then after many were sent to the island of Hainan [China] late in 1942. Three-quarters of the Australians captured on Ambon had died before the war's end. Of the 582 who remained on Ambon, 405 died. They died of overwork, malnutrition, disease and one of the most brutal regimes among camps in which bashings were routine.

In 1946, incidents which followed the fall of Ambon became the subject of one of the largest ever war crimes trials: 93 Japanese personnel were tried by an Australian military tribunal at Ambon. Rear Admiral Hatakeyama was found to have ordered the Laha massacres, however he had died before he could be tried. Commander Kunito Hatakeyama, who was in direct command of the massacres, was sentenced to execution by hanging. Lieutenant Kenichi Nakagawa was sentenced to 20 years imprisonment. Three other Japanese officers were executed for mistreatment of POWs and/or civilians on other occasions, during 1942–45. (The trials were the basis for the feature film Blood Oath, released in 1990.)

General Itō was sentenced to death that same year for war crimes committed in other parts of the Pacific.

Other subsequent events
Approximately 30 Australian soldiers, including Jinkins, escaped from Ambon, in the space of several weeks after the surrender, often by rowing prahus (canoes) to Seram.

Another result of the capture of Ambon was the realisation of Australian fears of air attacks, when Japanese planes based at Ambon took part in major air raids on Darwin, Australia on 19 February.

Notes

References

Sources 

 
 

 
 

 
 

Conflicts in 1942
1942 in the Dutch East Indies
South West Pacific theatre of World War II
Battles and operations of World War II involving the Netherlands
Japanese occupation of the Dutch East Indies
Battles of World War II involving Australia
Battles of World War II involving Japan
Battles of World War II involving the United States
History of Maluku (province)
January 1942 events
February 1942 events
Mass murder in 1942
Japanese war crimes